This is a list of fellows of the Royal Society elected in 1690.

Fellow 
Jacobus Grandi  (1646–1691)

References

1690
1690 in science
1690 in England